Butler County Courthouse is a historic courthouse located at Poplar Bluff, Butler County, Missouri.  It was built in 1928, and is a three-story, Classical Revival style brick building of cast concrete construction.  Each side is nine bays wide, with the central five bays having two-story engaged Doric order columns and pilasters on the top two floors.

It was added to the National Register of Historic Places in 1994.

References

County courthouses in Missouri
Courthouses on the National Register of Historic Places in Missouri
Neoclassical architecture in Missouri
Government buildings completed in 1928
Buildings and structures in Butler County, Missouri
National Register of Historic Places in Butler County, Missouri